Roald Dahl (1916–1990) was a British author and scriptwriter, and "the most popular writer of children's books since Enid Blyton", according to Philip Howard, the literary editor of The Times. He was raised by his Norwegian mother, who took him on annual trips to Norway, where she told him the stories of trolls and witches present in the dark Scandinavian fables. Dahl was influenced by the stories, and returned to many of the themes in his children's books. His mother also nurtured a passion in the young Dahl for reading and literature.

Dahl left the Repton School in Derby England in 1934, and he did not go to college. Instead, he took a job in East Africa to sell oil. During this time World War II started and Dahl became a pilot in the Royal Air Force (RAF). Before engaging in active service he crashed in the Libyan desert and was seriously injured. After recovering, he joined his company and was responsible for shooting down several enemy aircraft, however ultimately effects of his injuries made him unfit to fly. He was posted to Washington as an assistant air attaché, ostensibly a diplomatic post, but which also included espionage and propaganda work. In 1942 the writer C. S. Forester asked him to provide details of his experiences in North Africa which Forester hoped to use in an article in The Saturday Evening Post. Instead of the notes which Forester expected, Dahl sent a finished story for which he was paid $900. In 1943 Dahl wrote his first story for children titled: “The Gremlins.” This story was also intended for Walt Disney, who was interested in turning it into a film. This was Dahl's first children's book published, though it was originally not written as such. Dahl continued to write short stories, although these were all aimed at the adult market. Dahl worked for periodicals as a short story contributor. Other stories were sold to magazines and newspapers, and were later compiled into collections, the first of which was published in 1946. Dahl began to make up bedtime stories for the children, and these formed the basis of several of his stories. His first novel intentionally written for children, James and the Giant Peach, was published in 1961, which was followed, along with others, by Charlie and the Chocolate Factory (1964), Fantastic Mr Fox (1970), Danny, the Champion of the World (1975), The BFG (1982) and Matilda in 1988.

Dahl's first script was for a stage work, The Honeys, which appeared on Broadway in 1955. He followed this with a television script, "Lamb to the Slaughter", for the Alfred Hitchcock Presents series. He also co-wrote screenplays for film, including for You Only Live Twice (1967) and Chitty Chitty Bang Bang (1968). In 1982 Dahl published the first of three editions of poems—all aimed at children. The following year he edited a book of ghost stories. He also wrote several works of non-fiction, including three autobiographies, a cookery book, a safety leaflet for the British railways and a book on measles, which was about the death of his daughter Olivia from measles encephalitis.

As at 2019, Dahl's works have been translated into 63 languages and have sold more than 200 million books worldwide. Dahl was known as “The World’s No. 1 Story-teller” due to how his books celebrate nonsense, imagination, and creativity. It is because of this that his books are still popular with children. His awards for contribution to literature include the 1983 World Fantasy Award for Life Achievement, and the British Book Awards' Children's Author of the Year in 1990. In 2008 The Times placed Dahl 16th on its list of "The 50 greatest British writers since 1945". He has been referred to by The Independent as "one of the greatest storytellers for children of the 20th century". On his death in 1990, Howard considered him "one of the most widely read and influential writers of our generation". Dahl, even today, is still popular with readers. He has been able to draw everyone in with his exaggeration, effective description, unique ideas, and extraordinary words.

Novels

Short story collections

Scripts
Many of Dahl's works were used as the basis for films or television programmes. The following are where he is credited as the writer of the performed script.

Poems

Books edited

Non-fiction

Notes and references

Explanatory notes

Citations

General and cited sources 

 
 
 
 
 
  
 
 
 

Bibliographies by writer
Bibliographies of British writers
Mystery fiction bibliographies
Bibliography
Bibliography